The Kingdom of Serbs, Croats and Slovenes was represented at the 1928 Winter Olympics in St. Moritz, Switzerland with a delegation of six competitors.

Cross-country skiing

Men

References

 Olympic Winter Games 1928, full results by sports-reference.com

Nations at the 1928 Winter Olympics
1928
Olympics, Winter